The 1978 Virginia Slims of Detroit  was a women's tennis tournament played on indoor carpet courts at the Cobo Hall & Arena  in Detroit, Michigan in the United States that was part of the 1978 Virginia Slims World Championship Series. It was the seventh edition of the tournament and was held from February 21 through February 26, 1978. First-seeded Martina Navratilova won her second consecutive singles title at the event and earned $20,000 first-prize money.

Finals

Singles
 Martina Navratilova defeated  Dianne Fromholtz 6–3, 6–2
 It was Navratilova's 6th singles title of the year and the 19th of her career.

Doubles
 Billie Jean King /  Martina Navratilova defeated  Kerry Reid /  Wendy Turnbull 6–3, 6–4

Prize money

References

External links
 Women's Tennis Association (WTA) tournament details
 International Tennis Federation (ITF) tournament edition details

Virginia Slims of Detroit
Virginia Slims of Detroit
Virginia Slims of Detroit
Virginia Slims of Detroit